The Evangelical-Lutheran Church of Saxony (Evangelisch-Lutherische Landeskirche Sachsens) is one of 20 member Churches of the Evangelical Church in Germany (EKD), covering most of the state of Saxony. Its headquarters are in Dresden, and its bishop (styled Bishop of Saxony) has his or her seat at Meissen Cathedral.

History
Historically, its organisation became an example for other Protestant churches to be founded throughout Europe, the so-called "Saxon model" of a church as introduced by Martin Luther itself. It was closely tied to the state, whereby the Elector of Saxony protected the evangelical faith in his jurisdiction. Since the Reformation, the Lutheran orthodoxy (the "purest form" of Lutheranism) prevailed among the general population in Saxony and was secured first by its Ernestine and later Albertine Wettin rulers. Beginning in the 17th century, Pietism also gained a significant following, especially among the working class.

In 2019, Carsten Rentzing, bishop of the church since 2015, resigned his position after controversy arose about his connections to far-right parties and groups.

Bishops 
 1922–1933: Ludwig Heinrich Ihmels
 1933–1945: Friedrich Otto Coch
 1945–1947: Franz Lau
 1947–1953: Hugo Hahn
 1953–1971: Gottfried Noth
 1971–1994: Johannes Hempel
 1994–2004: Volker Kreß
 2004–2015: Jochen Bohl
 2015–2019: Carsten Rentzing

Parishioners
1922: 4,509,000, then by parishioners by far the biggest Lutheran church in Germany
2012: 764,000
2013: 754,451
2015: 713,648
2017: 689,858
2018: 677,064
2019: 663,525
2020: 647,238

Practices
Ordination of women and blessing of same-sex unions were allowed.

Notes

External links
 The Lutheran Church in Saxony - homepage (Eng.)

Saxony
Saxony
Christianity in Saxony
Lutheran World Federation members